The following are lists of dystopian works:

 List of dystopian comics
 List of dystopian films
 List of dystopian literature
 List of dystopian TV programs
 List of dystopian music